Chilocampyla is a genus of moths in the family Gracillariidae.

Species
Chilocampyla dyariella Busck, 1900
Chilocampyla psidiella Busck, 1934

External links
Global Taxonomic Database of Gracillariidae (Lepidoptera)

Acrocercopinae
Gracillarioidea genera